John Francis Daley (May 25, 1887 – August 31, 1988) was a Major League Baseball shortstop who played with the St. Louis Browns in . At the time of his death, he was the oldest living former major league player.

See also
List of centenarians (Major League Baseball players)
List of centenarians (sportspeople)

References

External links

1887 births
1988 deaths
American centenarians
Men centenarians
Major League Baseball shortstops
Baseball players from Pennsylvania
St. Louis Browns players
Fordham Rams baseball players
People from Clearfield County, Pennsylvania
Columbus Senators players
Springfield Reapers players
People from DuBois, Pennsylvania